Joseph Benjamin Smith (January 26, 1928 – December 2, 2019) was an American music industry executive.

Early life 
Smith was born in Boston, Massachusetts and raised in Chelsea, Massachusetts. His parents were Phil and Lil Smith. Smith joined the United States Army after graduating high school in 1945 and served with the occupation forces in Okinawa.

Career 
Smith attended Yale. After graduation, he became a sportscaster and later a DJ at WMEX and WBZ in Boston. Smith was hired as national promotion manager at Warner Bros. in 1961 and later served as the label's general manager. He was named President of Warner Bros. in 1972. In 1975, he became chairman of Warner's sister company, Elektra/Asylum.

Smith briefly served as president of the National Academy of Recording Arts and Sciences in 1986. He became vice chairman and chief executive of Capitol-EMI that same year.

While at Capitol Records, Smith compiled 238 hours of recorded interviews with artists and executives. Excerpts from his recordings were included in his 1988 book Off the Record: An Oral History of Popular Music. In 2012, Smith donated these recordings to the Library of Congress.

Death 
Smith died December 2, 2019 at the age of 91.

References

External links 
 Joe Smith Collection: Library of Congress

1928 births
2019 deaths
Businesspeople from Boston
Businesspeople from Los Angeles
Yale University alumni
American music industry executives
20th-century American businesspeople